Vagos is a town (vila) in Portugal. It is located in Vagos Municipality, Aveiro District.

Towns in Portugal